Koki Oshima (大島 康樹, born 30 May 1996 in Shizuoka, Japan) is a Japanese footballer who plays for Tochigi SC.

Career

Kashiwa Reysol
Oshima made his official debut for Kashiwa Reysol in the J. League Division 1, J. League Cup on 9 October 2014 against Sanfrecce Hiroshima in Hiroshima Big Arch in Hiroshima, Japan. In the 72nd minute Oshima subbed in for Leandro. Oshima and his club lost the match 2-0.

Club statistics
Updated to 23 February 2018.

References

External links 

 Profile at Kashiwa Reysol
 

1996 births
Living people
Association football people from Saitama Prefecture
Japanese footballers
J1 League players
J3 League players
Kashiwa Reysol players
Kataller Toyama players
J.League U-22 Selection players
Tochigi SC players
Thespakusatsu Gunma players
Association football forwards